Katheryn Russell-Brown (born Katheryn K. Russell, September 17, 1961) is an American social scientist, professor of law and director of the Center for the Study of Race and Race Relations at University of Florida Law School. Her main areas of expertise are race and crime, sociology of law and criminal law.

Education

Russell-Brown received her B.A. from the University of California at Berkeley, her J.D. from the Hastings College of Law and her Ph.D. from the criminology department of the University of Maryland, College Park.

Memberships

Russell-Brown is a member of the Academy of Criminal Justice Sciences and the American Bar Association, and is currently executive counselor to the American Society of Criminology. She is also on the editorial board of the Carolina Academic Press, as well as that of Critical Criminology and Justice Quarterly.

Career

Russell-Brown previously taught at Alabama State University (1987-1989), Howard University (1991), City University of New York School of Law (1994), Washington College of Law (1997), and the University of Maryland (1992-2003).

Russell-Brown was cited by the Supreme Court of the United States in the case Harris v. Alabama (1995) in regard to her article The Constitutionality of Jury Override in Alabama Death Penalty Cases (1994).

Works

As Katheryn K. Russell

The Constitutionality of Jury Override in Alabama Death Penalty Cases (Alabama Law Review: 1994)
The Color of Crime: Racial Hoaxes, White Fear, Black Protectionism, Police Harassment and Other Macroaggressions (New York University Press: 1998) 
Race and Crime: An Annotated Bibliography (Greenwood Press: 2000)
Petit Apartheid in the U.S. Criminal Justice System: The Dark Figure of Racism with Dragan Milovanovic (Carolina Academic Press: 2001)

As Katheryn Russell-Brown

Underground Codes: Race, Crime and Related Fires (New York University Press: 2004)
Protecting Our Own: Race, Crime, and African Americans (Perspectives on Multiracial America) (Rowman & Littlefield: 2006)
The Color of Crime (New York University Press: 2008)

Children's Books 
Little Melba and Her Big Trombone, illustrated by Frank Morrison (Lee & Low Books: 2014)
A Voice Named Aretha, illustrated by Laura Freeman (Bloomsbury: 2020)
She Was the First: The Trailblazing Life of Shirley Chisholm, illustrated by Eric Velasquez (Lee & Low Books: 2020)

Sources

Katheryn Russell-Brown at "Faculty and Staff", University of Florida Levin College of Law (Retrieved 4 October 2009) 
Spotlight: Katheryn Russell-Brown, University of Florida (Retrieved 4 October 2009)

See also
 Race and crime in the United States

External links
Petit Apartheid in the U.S. Criminal Justice System: The Dark Figure of Racism with Dragan Milovanovic (2001)
Katheryn Russell-Brown at the University of Florida Levin College of Law Website.
Spotlight: Katheryn Russell-Brown at the University of Florida Website. 
Katheryn Russell-Brown at the Open Society Institute Website.

1961 births
Living people
African-American academics
University of California, Berkeley alumni
University of California, Hastings College of the Law alumni
University of Maryland, College Park alumni
University of Florida faculty
Place of birth missing (living people)
Alabama State University faculty
Howard University faculty
City University of New York faculty
Washington College of Law faculty
University of Maryland, College Park faculty
21st-century African-American people
20th-century African-American people